Epaphius apicalis is a species of beetle in the family Carabidae. It was described by Victor Motschulsky in 1845.

References

Beetles described in 1845